Alien Incident is a 1996 point-and-click graphic adventure game. It was developed by Finnish game developer Housemarque and published by GameTek for MS-DOS.

Plot
On Halloween, Benjamin Richards is at his uncle's mansion to bear witness to his newest invention, the "Worm Hole Spawner". Upon activation, a wormhole brings an alien spaceship into the Solar System. The aliens kidnap Benjamin's uncle, whom the player must rescue in addition to stopping the alien threat.

Development
The game was initially developed by Bloodhouse (before the company merged with Terramarque to form Housemarque) and it was known during development as Leokadia. In January 1994 a six-person team had developed the game for nine months and it was due for release in Fall 1994 for PC and later for Amiga 1200. The game came out in 1996 for PC and the Amiga 1200 version was cancelled.

Reception
Pelit gave the game 90 out of 100.

References

External links

1996 video games
Adventure games
Alien abduction in video games
Cancelled Amiga games
DOS games
DOS-only games
GameTek games
Halloween video games
Housemarque games
Point-and-click adventure games
Video games about extraterrestrial life
Video games developed in Finland
Video games scored by Jonne Valtonen
Single-player video games